Dekker is a Dutch occupational surname equivalent to English Thatcher. Notable people with the surname include:

Aesop Dekker (born 1970), American rock drummer
Albert Dekker (1905–1968), American actor and politician
An Dekker (1931–2012), Dutch sculptor, graphic designer, and publisher
Anne Fleur Dekker (born 1994), Dutch environmentalist and journalist
Ans Dekker (born 1955), Dutch gymnast
Anouk Dekker (born 1986), Dutch footballer
Carl Dekker (1922–2000), pseudonym of the Australian historian and journalist John Laffin
Cees Dekker (born 1959), Dutch physicist
Chris Dekker (born 1945), Dutch footballer
Ben Dekker (born 1940),  South African forester, actor, politician, poet and artist.
Cornelis Dekker (c.1645–1685), Dutch physician and essayist known as Cornelis Bontekoe
Cornelis Gerrits Dekker (1618–1678), Dutch landscape painter
Daniël Dekker (born 1960), Dutch disc jockey and radio host
Desmond Dekker (1941–2006), Jamaican singer
Eduard Douwes Dekker (1820–1887), Dutch writer; also known as Multatuli
Elly Dekker (born 1943), Dutch astrophysicist and museum curator
Ernest Douwes Dekker (1879–1950), Dutch politician and writer. Also known as Danudirja Setiabudi, a National Hero of Indonesia (registered). His Indonesian name is used to name street shortly with "Setiabudi".
Erik Dekker (born 1970), Dutch racing cyclist
Femke Dekker (born 1979), Dutch rower
Frans Dekker (1684–1751), Dutch painter
Fred Dekker (born 1959), American film director and writer
Gé Dekker (1904–1995), Dutch competitive swimmer
Han Dekker (1913–?), Dutch rower
Hannie Singer-Dekker (1917–2007), Dutch Labour Party politician
Hendrik Adriaan Christiaan Dekker (1836–1905), Dutch painter and lithographer
Inge Dekker (born 1985), Dutch competitive swimmer
Jacob Gelt Dekker (born 1948), Dutch businessman, philanthropist, and writer
James Lawrence Dekker (born 1960), South African businessman, photographer
Jan Dekker (basketball)
Jan Dekker (sailor) (born 1967), French/South African competitive sailor
Jan Dekker (born 1990), Dutch darts player
Jens Dekker (born 1998), Dutch cyclo-cross cyclist
Jeremias de Dekker (c. 1610 – 1666), Dutch poet
Job Dekker,  Dutch biologist
Jonathan Dekker (born 1983), American football tight end
Laura Dekker (born 1995), New Zealand-born Dutch solo sailor
Lia Dekker (born 1987), Dutch competitive swimmer
Louis Dekker (1894–1973), Dutch coxswain
Marcel Dekker (born 1930s), Dutch-born American encyclopedia publisher 
Mark Dekker (born 1969), Zimbabwean cricketer
Maurits Dekker (1896–1962), Dutch novelist and playwright
Maxim Dekker (born 2004), Dutch footballer
Michelle Dekker (born 1996), Dutch snowboarder
Niels Dekker (born 1983), Dutch-born Canadian soccer player
Paul Dekker (1931–2001), Canadian-American football player
Rachelle Dekker (born 1986), American novelist, daughter of Ted Dekker
Rick Dekker (born 1995), Dutch footballer
Ron Dekker (born 1966), Dutch competitive swimmer
Sam Dekker (born 1994), American basketball player
Sander Dekker (born 1975), Dutch VVD politician
Sidney Dekker (born 1969), Dutch-born psychologist and safety scientist
Steve Dekker (born 1988), Dutch DJ known as "Dr. Peacock"
Sybilla Dekker (born 1942), Dutch VVD politician
Ted Dekker (born 1962), Indonesian-born American author
Theodorus Dekker (1927–2021), Dutch mathematician known for Dekker's algorithm
Thijs Dekker (born 1997), Dutch footballer
Thomas Dekker (writer) (c. 1572 – 1632), English writer
Thomas Dekker (cyclist) (born 1984), Dutch racing cyclist
Thomas Dekker (actor) (born 1987), American actor
 (born 1993), Dutch decathlete
Tony Dekker (born 1980s), Canadian singer and songwriter
Travis Dekker (born 1985), American football tight end
Tristan Dekker (born 1996), Dutch footballer
Vince Gino Dekker (born 1997), Dutch footballer
Wade Dekker (born 1994), Australian soccer player
Wisse Dekker (1924–2012), Dutch businessman; CEO of Philips

Fictional characters
John Dekker (Wing Commander), computer game character
Maggie Dekker, character in the TV series Eli Stone

Given name
Dekker Curry (born 1966), Irish cricketer
Dekker Dreyer (born 1980), American film director and producer

See also
Dekkers (surname)
Decker (surname)
Den Dekker

Dutch-language surnames
Occupational surnames
Surnames of Dutch origin